The Don Mariano Marcos Memorial State University (DMMMSU) is the state university system serving the province of La Union in the Philippines. Its main autonomous unit is in Bacnotan. It was created by former president Ferdinand Marcos by using Presidential Decree 1778 to combine a number of state-run schools in La Union into a single state college in 1981.  Like Mariano Marcos State University in Ilocos Norte, it is named for the former president's father, Mariano Marcos.

Before 1993, DMMMSU occupied seven campuses throughout the province.  After a reorganization that year, these campuses were grouped into four autonomous units, simply called the North La Union Main Campus (DMMMSU-NLUC), the Mid La Union Campus (DMMMSU-MLUC), the South La Union Campus (DMMMSU-SLUC), and the Open University System (DMMMSU-OU). Each unit is headed by a chancellor/director, while the whole system is headed by the university president Dr. Jaime I. Manuel Jr.

North La Union Campus

The North La Union campus serves the seat of DMMMSU's central administration and was created in 1993 out of what were then the College of Agriculture and Forestry (CAF), Institute of Veterinary Medicine (IVM), Institute of Computer Studies (ICS), and Institute of Environmental Studies (IES). The College of Fisheries Balaoan was also absorbed into NLUC and was made the Fisheries Research and Training Institute (FRTI).

In 2002, the College of Agriculture and Forestry was split into the College of Agriculture and the Institute of Agroforestry and Watershed Management (IAWM).  The latter was formed by bringing together the agroforestry and forestry programs of the CAF.

The Bacnotan Campus of NLUC hosts two national research institutes: the Sericulture Research and Development Institute (SRDI) and the National Apiculture Research Training and Development Institute (NARTDI).

Courses Offered
Level IV Re-accredited 
Bachelor of Science in Agroforestry
Bachelor of Science in Agribusiness Management
Bachelor of Elementary Education
Level III Re-accredited 
Bachelor of Secondary Education
Bachelor of Science in Environmental Science
Bachelor of Science in  Information Systems
Bachelor of Science in Agriculture
Bachelor of Science in Agricultural & Biosystems Engineering
Level II Accredited/Re-accredited
Master of Science in Education Major in Technology and Livelihood Education
Master of Science in Environmental Studies
Master of Science in Rural Community Development
Doctor of Veterinary Medicine
Level I Accredited/Re-accredited
Doctor of Philosophy in Agricultural Education
Doctor of Philosophy in Extension Education
Doctor of Philosophy in Agronomy
Doctor of Philosophy in Animal Science
Doctor of Philosophy in Educational Administration
Master of Science in Agricultural Education
Master of Science in Agronomy
Master of Science in Animal Science
Bachelor of Science in Forestry
Bachelor of Science in Biology

Mid La Union Campus

La Union School of Arts and Trade was established in 1907 by D. Aran, an American, its founder and its first principal. It was one of the earliest vocational schools in the Philippines; it started as an intermediate school with only five teachers and 88 students. In 1917, Mr. Huncy, succeeded him until 1922. Secondary courses were then offered. The intermediate curriculum was eventually dropped in 1927 and, in 1928, the La Union Trade School was transferred to its present site and converted into the secondary level. It was the incumbency of the first Filipino principal, Catalino Calica, that the school turned out its first set of eight graduates. The school closed during the Second World War.

By virtue of R.A. 543 on 16 June 1950, the La Union Trade School was placed under the support of the national government. R.A. 801 was enacted on 21 June 1952 to convert the institution into a National Regional School of Arts and Trades known as the La Union School of Arts and Trades. Tranquilino de los Trinos was the first superintendent. In 1957, Apolinario Apilado took over as the second superintendent and, in 1957, Fermin Taruc became the third superintendent. Taruc's administration placed much emphasis in the improvement of the standard of instruction in all levels.

In 1975, Avelino Ascuncion assumed office as the fourth superintendent. The school served as a Regional Development Center for Practical Arts in Region I. The degree of Bachelor of Science in Industrial Technology was offered during the school year 1976–1977. The school accommodated the extension classes of UP Graduate School, Baguio City, for the degree of Master of Management. Likewise, the school was chosen by Engineering Equipment Inc. as its training center in northern Luzon where vocational graduates underwent further training in their fields.

On May 25, 1978, Hipolito Pacis took over as the fifth superintendent and this marked the greatest milestone for LUSAT. The school was integrated into the Don Mariano Marcos Memorial State University on 15 January 1981 through P.D. 1778. Dr. Bienvenido Agpaoa became its first president. In 1989, Dr. Manuel Corpus was installed as the second president. In 1996, DMMMSU has been adjudged by the CHED (Commission on Higher Education) as number 7 among top universities and colleges (public and private) in the Philippines. Most graduates rated high in their respective board and licensure examinations. On 23 July 1999, Dr. Dionisio Gat Ducusin became the third president of the university. The Mid-La Union Campus has Dr. Rodolfo R. Apigo as its chancellor, assuming the position on 23 September 1999. With transformational leaders at the helm of DMMMSU and the MLUC in particular, the university is at the threshold of the new millennium upholding excellence in instruction, research, extension, and production for global competitiveness.

Dr. Ernesto R. Gapasin, former MLUC chancellor became the fourth president of the university.

Courses Offered
Level IV Re-accredited 
Bachelor of Science in Industrial Technology
Level III Re-accredited 
Doctor of Philosophy in Technological Education Management
Doctor of Philosophy in Development Administration
Master of Arts in Technology Education
Master in Development Administration
Bachelor of Science in Information Technology
Bachelor of Science in Electrical Engineering
Bachelor of Science in Mechanical Engineering
Bachelor of Elementary Education
Bachelor of Science in Industrial Education
Bachelor of Arts in Political Science
Bachelor of Arts in Public Administration
Bachelor of Science in Business Administration
Bachelor of Science in Office Administration Management
Bachelor of Science in Hotel and Restaurant Management
Level II Accredited/Re-accredited
Master in Management Engineering
Master in Information Technology
Bachelor of Science in Electro-Mechanical Technology
Bachelor of Science in Food Technology
Bachelor of Science in Textile and Fashion Technology

South La Union Campus

The DMMMSU College of Arts and Sciences occupies a  lot, consisting of several modern buildings, including a large library and an unfinished gymnasium.

In the mid-1940s a citizen, Ramon Mabutas, suggested establishing a public high school, leading Mayor Miguel Fontanilia and members of the Municipal Council to organize a committee to begin preparations for such a school. The committee included Dr. Manuel Cases, Atty. Bernardo Gapus, Atty. Mauro Ordoña, Atty. Telesforo Ofiana, Atty. Esperidion Ventura and Agaton Umanos. The South Provincial High School opened on July 23, 1945.

Courses Offered
Level IV Re-accredited	  	 
Doctor of Philosophy in Science Education
Bachelor in Elementary Education
Bachelor of Secondary Education
Level III Re-accredited
Master of Arts in Guidance and Counseling
Master of Arts in Educational Management
Master of Arts in Special Education
Master of Arts in Science Education
Master of Arts in Mathematics Education
Master of Arts in Language Teaching
Master of Arts in Teaching Music
Bachelor of Science in Biology
Bachelor of Science in Mathematics
Bachelor of Science in Psychology
Bachelor of Science in Computer Science (Straight Curriculum)
LeveL II Accredited
Bachelor of Science in Agriculture
Bachelor of Agricultural Technology
Bachelor of Science in Fisheries
Bachelor of Science in Nursing
LeveL I Accredited
Doctor of Philosophy in Mathematics Education
Doctor of Philosophy in Educational Administration
Master of Arts in Physical Education

See also
List of state schools, colleges and universities in the Philippines
List of forestry universities and colleges

References

External links

Official website
Official Facebook Page
Follow us on Twiiter
Presidential Decree 1778 at www.lawphil.net

Universities and colleges in La Union
Educational institutions established in 1981
State universities and colleges in the Philippines
Philippine Association of State Universities and Colleges
1981 establishments in the Philippines
Establishments by Philippine presidential decree

pam:Mariano Marcos State University